Rogelio Arango (born 17 May 1959) is a Colombian former professional racing cyclist. He rode in the 1985 Tour de France. He also competed in the individual road race at the 1984 Summer Olympics.

References

External links
 

1959 births
Living people
Colombian male cyclists
Sportspeople from Magdalena Department
Cyclists at the 1984 Summer Olympics
Olympic cyclists of Colombia